Edward Everett (1794–1865) was an American politician, pastor, educator, diplomat, and orator.

Edward Everett may also refer to:
Edward Everett (artist) (1818–1903), American artist
Edward William Everett (1821–1904), mayor of Nelson, New Zealand
Edward Hamlin Everett (1851–1929), American businessman and philanthropist
Edward A. Everett (1860–1928), New York state legislator
Edward A. Everett (1861–?), Wisconsin State Assemblyman
Edward Everett Square, a square in Boston

People with the given names
Edward Everett Ayer (1841–1927), American business magnate and philanthropist
Edward Everett Bruen (1859–1938), mayor of East Orange, New Jersey
Edward Everett Cox (1867–1931), American newspaper publisher
Edward Everett Dale (1879–1972), American historian
Edward E. Denison (1873–1953), American politician
Edward Everett Eslick (1872–1932), American congressman
E. Everett Evans (1893–1958), American science fiction writer
Edward Everett Grosscup (1860–1933), American politician and public official
Edward Everett Hale (1822–1909), American author, historian, and  minister
Ed Harlow or Edward Everett Harlow, Jr. (born 1960), American biologist
Edward Everett Hayden (1858–1932), American naval officer and meteorologist, and founding member of the National Geographic Society
Edward Everett Holland (1861–1941), American congressman
Edward Everett Horton (1886–1970), American character actor
Edward Everett McCall (1863–1924), American jurist, bureaucrat, and politician
Edward Everett Nourse (1863–1929), American theologian
Edward E. Rice (1847–1924), American composer and theater producer
Edward Everett Robbins (1860–1919), American congressman
Edward Everett Rose (1862–1939), American playwright
Edward Everett Smith (1861–1931), Lieutenant Governor of Minnesota
Patrick Dennis or Edward Everett Tanner III (1921–1976), American author

Everett, Edward